Orthenches semifasciata is a moth of the family Plutellidae. It is endemic to New Zealand.

Taxonomy 
This species was first described by Alfred Philpott in 1915. He used a female specimen collected by C. C. Fenwick which was taken in Queenstown in January. George Hudson discussed and illustrated this species in his 1928 book The Butterflies and Moths of New Zealand. In this book Hudson synonymised O. similis with O. semifasciata despite Philpott providing distinguishing features for these two species. In 1988 John S. Dugdale disagreed with this synonymising and separately listed the two species. The holotype specimen of O. semifasciata is held at the Museum of New Zealand Te Papa Tongarewa.

Description 
The wingspan is 16–18 mm. The head, palpi, and thorax are white mixed with brown and the abdomen is grey. The forewings are elongate, the costa gently arched, the apex subacute, the termen rounded and oblique. They are white, irrorated with shining dark brown, especially on dorsal half. The markings are shining dark brown. The hindwings are light fuscous-grey.

Distribution 
This species is endemic to New Zealand. Along with the type locality of Queenstown this species has also been collected near Lake Hakapoua in Fiordland National Park, on Mount Titiroa in Fiordland, at Rastus Burn Basin in The Remarkables at an altitude of 1640m, and around Aoraki/ Mount Cook.

Biology and behaviour 
This species has been recorded as being on the wing in January and February.

Habitat and hosts 
The larvae of O. semifasciata feed on Dracophyllum species.

References

External links 
 Image of holotype

Plutellidae
Moths of New Zealand
Moths described in 1915
Endemic fauna of New Zealand
Taxa named by Alfred Philpott
Endemic moths of New Zealand